The 2008 United States presidential election in Colorado took place on November 4, 2008, as a part of the 2008 United States presidential election throughout all 50 states and the District of Columbia. Voters chose nine representatives, or electors to the Electoral College, who voted for president and vice president.

Colorado was won by Democratic nominee Barack Obama by a margin of victory of 8.95%. Obama took 53.66% of the vote to McCain's 44.71%. The state was heavily targeted by both campaigns, although, prior to the election, all 17 news organizations actually considered this a state Obama would win, or otherwise considered as a likely blue state. While George W. Bush narrowly carried the state in 2004, the Centennial State ultimately flipped allegiance to Obama. This was the first time since 1992 in which the state was won by a Democrat in a presidential election, as well as the first time since 1944 in which it voted differently than Montana, another rocky mountain state.

Key to Obama's victory was Democratic dominance in the Denver area, sweeping not just the city but also the heavily populated suburban counties around Denver, particularly Adams, Arapahoe, and Jefferson counties, as well as winning Larimer County, home to Fort Collins. Obama also took over 70% of the vote in Boulder County, home to Boulder. McCain's most populated county wins were in El Paso County, where Colorado Springs is located, and Weld County, home to Greeley.

Colorado served as the tipping-point state for Obama's overall victory in the presidential election - that is, the first state to give a candidate their 270th electoral vote when all states are arranged by their margins of victory.

Caucuses
 2008 Colorado Democratic caucuses
 2008 Colorado Republican caucuses

Campaign

Predictions
There were 16 news organizations who made state-by-state predictions of the election. Here are their last predictions before election day:

Polling

Pre-election polling taken in Colorado prior to the election mostly showed Obama with a slight lead. He led every poll after September 25. The average of the last three polls showed Obama leading McCain 52% to 45%.

Fundraising
John McCain raised a total of $3,491,086. Barack Obama raised almost $11 million.

Advertising and visits
Obama and his interest groups spent $10,410,669. McCain and his interest groups spent $9,818,077. McCain/Palin visited the state 13 times. Obama/Biden visited the state 8 times.

Analysis

Changing demographics and a growing Hispanic population made the state more favorable to the Democrats, although Republicans still had a hold on the state due to the party's conservative stances on social issues like abortion, gay rights, and gun control.

Like most of the Mountain West, Colorado had been traditionally Republican beginning with the Eisenhower landslide of 1952, in which Eisenhower overperformed throughout the region. Between 1952 and 2004, inclusive, Democrats prevailed in Colorado only in 1964 and 1992—the former, a national Democratic landslide; the latter, a three-way contest in which independent candidate Ross Perot had disproportionate strength in the West. In addition, Republicans had mostly held control of the state legislature and most statewide offices since the 1960s. Although Democrats had bases of support in Adams and Pueblo Counties and in the south of the state, and generally carried Denver (albeit often by narrow margins), this was generally no match for Republican dominance of the Denver suburbs, El Paso County (Colorado Springs), Larimer County (Fort Collins), and, until Dukakis flipped it in 1988, Boulder County, as well as of most of the rural areas of the state.

Recently, however, there had been a growing population of Hispanic Americans, young professionals, and an influx of people from other states - all of whom tend to vote Democratic. These demographic changes caused the state's political ideology to shift. While Republicans still enjoyed an advantage in voter registration statewide, Democrats had been closing the gap. There had also been an increasing number of unaffiliated, independent-minded voters. Since 2004, Democrats had won the governorship, both Senate seats, three House seats, and control of both chambers in the state legislature.

At the presidential level, Colorado voted for Bush by 8.36% in 2000, making it the second-closest of the states carried by Dole in 1996 (behind only Virginia). Moreover, his 50.75% vote share was his lowest in any of the states carried by Dole in 1996, with Ralph Nader posting a relatively strong showing in the state in 2000. Colorado was not seriously contested in 2004, but Kerry cut Bush's margin down to 4.67% in the state, as Kerry flipped a number of ski-resort counties, scored the best showings in Denver and Boulder County of any presidential nominee in decades, and narrowed Bush's margins in the Denver-area suburban counties of Jefferson and Arapahoe, as well as in Larimer.

Bush's relatively narrow margin in the state in 2004, along with the demographic changes of the prior four years, led Colorado to become a crucial swing state in 2008. Both Barack Obama and John McCain campaigned extensively in the state. Several factors in the campaign favored the Democrat. Barack Obama did very well in the caucus, defeating opponent Hillary Clinton with almost 67% of the vote. On the other hand, John McCain badly lost the state to opponent Mitt Romney, who gained 60% of the vote. Moreover, the 2008 Democratic National Convention was held in Denver. The publicity generated from the event provided a strong boost to Obama. According to Real Clear Politics polling averages, Obama and McCain were neck-to-neck through the summer and early September. However, as the 2008 financial crisis hit, Obama's numbers in Colorado jumped to over 50%.

During the campaign, several media organizations reported on voting machine problems. There was also reporting on the controversial practice of "purging" voter registration lists.

On election day, Obama won by a comfortable margin, greater than his national average. Obama improved on John Kerry's performance throughout the state. He won landslides in the Democratic strongholds of Denver and Boulder; in both areas, Obama took more than 70% of the vote. He also further built upon Kerry's strength in a number of rich counties dominated by ski resorts along the Front Range; and continued to dominate the traditionally Democratic areas of Pueblo County, Adams County, and the thinly populated, Latino counties of southern Colorado.

McCain did best in the rural, conservative areas next to Kansas and Utah, where he won landslide margins. In Rio Blanco County, Mesa County, Yuma County, Washington County, Lincoln County, Bent County, Crowley County, and tiny Dolores County, Phillips County, Cheyenne County, and Kiowa County, he managed a slightly greater vote share than Bush in 2000. Voters in more populated El Paso County, home to conservative Colorado Springs, gave McCain a 19% margin, which, while a comfortable win, was far less than Bush's 35% margin in 2004. McCain also won two other relatively populated counties, Douglas County and Weld County, both outer suburbs of the Denver area—although, again, by substantially reduced margins compared to Bush in 2004. However, the largest suburban counties of the area, traditionally Republican Jefferson and Arapahoe Counties, flipped from Bush to Obama in 2008, as did Broomfield County, which cast its first presidential vote for Bush in 2004. Obama also flipped Larimer County. All together, this was more than enough to overcome Republican advantages elsewhere in the state, as Obama won it by a nearly nine-point margin.

Elsewhere in the state, Democrats also did well. Democrat Mark Udall defeated Republican Bob Schaffer for an open U.S. Senate seat; his vacated House seat was also won by Democrat Jared Polis. In addition, Democrat Betsy Markey defeated incumbent Republican Marilyn Musgrave, by 12 points for Colorado's 4th Congressional District seat. At the state level, Democrats picked up one seat in the Colorado Senate, but lost two seats in the Colorado House of Representatives.
Obama's 65.8% victory in Summit County was the highest percentage win by a Democratic presidential nominee in the county since Woodrow Wilson won the county with 70.3% of the vote back in 1916.

Obama became the first Democrat to win the White House without carrying Bent County since Franklin D. Roosevelt in 1944, as well as the first to do so without carrying Mineral or Otero Counties since Jimmy Carter in 1976.

Results

By county

Counties that flipped from Republican to Democratic
Alamosa (largest city: Alamosa)
Arapahoe (largest city: Littleton)
Broomfield (largest town: Broomfield)
Huerfano (largest city: Walsenburg)
Jefferson (largest city: Golden)
Larimer (largest city: Fort Collins)
Ouray (largest city: Ouray)

By congressional district
While Barack Obama won the state’s popular vote and 9 electoral votes, John McCain carried 4 of the state’s 7 congressional districts, including two seats held by Democrats.

Electors

Technically the voters of Colorado cast their ballots for electors: representatives to the Electoral College. Colorado is allocated 9 electors because it has 7 congressional districts and 2 senators. All candidates who appear on the ballot or qualify to receive write-in votes must submit a list of 9 electors, who pledge to vote for their candidate and his or her running mate. Whoever wins the majority of votes in the state is awarded all 9 electoral votes. Their chosen electors then vote for president and vice president. Although electors are pledged to their candidate and running mate, they are not obligated to vote for them. An elector who votes for someone other than his or her candidate is known as a faithless elector.

The electors of each state and the District of Columbia met on December 15, 2008, to cast their votes for president and vice president. The Electoral College itself never meets as one body. Instead the electors from each state and the District of Columbia met in their respective capitols.

The following were the members of the Electoral College from the state. All 9 were pledged to Obama and Biden:
 Wellington Webb
 Terry Phillips
 Camilla Auger
 Pam Shaddock
 Jennifer Trujillo-Sanchez
 Don Strickland
 Ann Knollman
 Polly Baca
 Margaret Atencio

References

 

Colorado
2008
United States president